Parivattam is a 1996 Tamil language drama film written and  directed by T. K. Rajendiran who earlier directed Thalattu (1993). The film was produced by Iyyanar Cine Arts. The film featured Jayaram and Suganya as the leading roles, while Goundamani, Senthil acted in the supporting roles. Deva was the music director of the film. The film was released on 27 September 1996.

Cast
 Jayaram
 Sukanya
 Goundamani
 Senthil
 Manivannan
 Karai Subbaiya

Soundtrack
Soundtrack was composed by Deva. Lyrics were by Vaali.

References

Films scored by Deva (composer)
1990s Tamil-language films
1996 films